Alloxylon brachycarpum is a species of plant in the family Proteaceae. It is found in Indonesia and Papua New Guinea. It is threatened by habitat loss.

Description
Alloxylon brachycarpum grows as a tree reaching 20–40 m high, with a rough, flaking grey to brown trunk. The adult leaves are simple and oval shaped, measuring 6–15 cm long by 2.5–5 cm wide with entire margins. The orange-red flower heads each contain 8 to 25 individual flowers arranged in racemes. These are followed by the development of the leathery seed pods, or fruit, up to 14 cm long and 2.5 cm wide, each of which contain 10-14 winged seeds in two rows. It resembles the Australian species A. flammeum, which has longer, narrower leaves and brighter flowers.

Taxonomy
Dutch botanist Herman Sleumer described this species as Embothrium brachycarpum in 1939 before transferring it to the genus Oreocallis. However the fruit of the type specimen were deformed and the species in fact has the largest fruit of the genus.

Peter Weston and Mike Crisp of the Royal Botanic Gardens in Sydney reviewed and recognised the Australasian members of the genus Oreocallis as distinct from their South American counterparts, and hence reallocated them to the new genus Alloxylon in 1991.

Local native names include kawoli in Merauke, and anga in Trangan.

Distribution and habitat 
Alloxylon brachycarpum is found in dry rainforests and eucalypt-bamboo forests in southern New Guinea, along the Upper Merauke River, Lower Fly River and Oriomo River, and in the Aru Islands. Its ecological community is threatened by logging.

References

brachycarpum
Endangered plants
Trees of the Maluku Islands
Trees of New Guinea
Plants described in 1939
Taxonomy articles created by Polbot